Daneți is a commune in Dolj County, Oltenia, Romania with a population of 7,211 people. It is composed of four villages: Brabeți, Braniște, Daneți and Locusteni.

Most of the village's population are farmers. Principal agricultural crops are corn, grain, and grapes: householders also maintain individual vegetable gardens. Daneţi offers a few very small shops where bread and other products needed daily can be bought. Electricity is offered as well as internet connection for a small fee. Daneţi is 50 kilometers from the nearest big city, Craiova. Transportation to and from the town is provided by a bus that run every 30 minutes from 6am to 6pm.

References

Communes in Dolj County
Localities in Oltenia